Zythos strigata is a moth of the family Geometridae first described by William Warren in 1896. It is found on Peninsular Malaysia, Borneo, Java, Bali and Palawan and Balabac Island in the Philippines.

Subspecies
Zythos strigata strigata (Palawan)
Zythos strigata rubescens (Prout, 1938) (Bali)

References

Moths described in 1896
Scopulini